Meta 4 is a five-issue comic book series by Ted McKeever published by ShadowLine. The first issue was released on June 9, 2010, and the second issue was released on July 7, 2010.

Plot
Meta 4 begins with an astronaut waking on a beach with amnesia—he is unable to recall how he got there. The astronaut meets a large muscular woman named "Gasolina" who is dressed in a costume resembling that of Santa Claus. The astronaut notices a number of scars on his body that he can not explain. Author Ted McKeever has called the significance of these scars twofold: "They are both evidence of a mystery that will unfold as the story progresses, as well as a textured map that has meaning to it because of where they are on his body".

Production
McKeever began actively producing Meta 4 after doing a series of black-and-white short story comics for publisher Marvel. It is based on notes he had compiled over previous years. McKeever has described the work as "a journey of self-discovery on a road trip of bizarre nightmares, twisted romance and scientific comedic insanity, spanning from Coney Island to the desolate Midwest". He has also described the main two characters as representing two different mysteries: the astronaut being the mystery of physicality, and Gasolina being the mystery of language.

McKeever initially planned to create Meta 4 as a graphic novel of a hundred or more pages, but was deterred by Jim Valentino of Shadowline. Valentino said of the idea: "With a graphic novel, you only have one opportunity to promote and sell a work".

As inspiration for the series, McKeever points to classic science fiction films that he watched as a child, particularly Planet of the Apes. "Hands down, that movie changed my life" McKeever said. Other influences include Andromeda Strain, THX-1138, Soylent Green and Omega Man.

Reception
Dean Stell of the Weekly Comic Book Review gave the first issue a "B−", saying that he found it confusing and slow. He did, however, praise the art—commenting that the simple black-and-white line art worked well for the subject. Chris Arrant of Newsarama said that the style of the series is difficult to describe, but that it is "more identifiable than 99% of comics’ artists out there".

References